Differential equations play a prominent role in many scientific areas: mathematics, physics, engineering, chemistry, biology, medicine, economics, etc. This list presents differential equations that have received specific names, area by area.

Mathematics 
 Ablowitz-Kaup-Newell-Segur (AKNS) system
 Clairaut's equation
 Hypergeometric differential equation
 Jimbo–Miwa–Ueno isomonodromy equations
 Painlevé equations
 Picard–Fuchs equation to describe the periods of elliptic curves
 Schlesinger's equations
 Sine-Gordon equation
 Sturm–Liouville theory of orthogonal polynomials and separable partial differential equations
 Universal differential equation

Algebraic geometry
 Calabi flow in the study of Calabi-Yau manifolds

Complex analysis
 Cauchy–Riemann equations

Differential geometry
 Equations for a minimal surface
 Liouville's equation
 Ricci flow, used to prove the Poincaré conjecture
 Tzitzeica equation

Dynamical systems and Chaos theory
 Rabinovich–Fabrikant equations

Mathematical physics
 General Legendre equation
 Heat equation
 Laplace's equation in potential theory
 Poisson's equation in potential theory

Ordinary Differential Equations (ODEs)
 Bernoulli differential equation
 Cauchy–Euler equation
 Riccati equation
 Hill differential equation

Riemannian geometry
 Gauss–Codazzi equations

Physics

Astrophysics
 Chandrasekhar's white dwarf equation
 Lane-Emden equation 
 Emden–Chandrasekhar equation
 Hénon–Heiles system

Classical mechanics

Electromagnetism
 Continuity equation for conservation laws
 Maxwell's equations
 Poynting's theorem

Fluid dynamics and hydrology

General relativity
 Einstein field equations
 Friedmann equations
 Geodesic equation
 Mathisson–Papapetrou–Dixon equations
 Schrödinger–Newton equation

Materials science
 Ginzburg–Landau equations in superconductivity
 London equations in superconductivity
 Poisson–Boltzmann equation in molecular dynamics

Nuclear physics
 Radioactive decay equations

Plasma physics
 Gardner equation
 KdV equation
 Kuramoto–Sivashinsky equation
 Vlasov equation

Quantum mechanics and quantum field theory
 Dirac equation, the relativistic wave equation for electrons and positrons
 Gardner equation
 Klein–Gordon equation
 Knizhnik–Zamolodchikov equations in quantum field theory
 Nonlinear Schrödinger equation in quantum mechanics
 Schrödinger's equation
 Schwinger–Dyson equation
 Yang-Mills equations in gauge theory

Thermodynamics and statistical mechanics
 Continuity equation for conservation laws
 Diffusion equation
 Heat equation
 Kardar-Parisi-Zhang equation
 Kuramoto–Sivashinsky equation
 Liñán's equation as a model of diffusion flame
 Maxwell relations
 Zeldovich–Frank-Kamenetskii equation to model flame propagation

Waves (mechanical or electromagnetic)
 D'Alembert's wave equation
 Eikonal equation in wave propagation
 Euler–Poisson–Darboux equation in wave theory
 Helmholtz equation

Engineering

Electrical and Electronic Engineering
 Chua's circuit
 Liénard equation to model oscillating circuits
 Nonlinear Schrödinger equation in fiber optics
 Telegrapher's equations
 Van der Pol oscillator

Game theory
 Differential game equations

Mechanical engineering
 Euler–Bernoulli beam theory
 Timoshenko beam theory

Nuclear engineering
 Neutron diffusion equation

Optimal control
 Linear-quadratic regulator
 Matrix differential equation
 PDE-constrained optimization
 Riccati equation
 Shape optimization

Orbital mechanics
 Clohessy–Wiltshire equations

Signal processing
 Filtering theory
 Kushner equation
 Zakai equation
 Rudin-Osher-Fatemi equation in total variation denoising

Transportation engineering
 Law of conservation in the kinematic wave model of traffic flow theory

Chemistry
 Allen–Cahn equation in phase separation
 Cahn–Hilliard equation in phase separation
 Chemical reaction model
 Brusselator
 Oregonator
 Master equation
 Rate equation
 Streeter–Phelps equation in water quality modeling

Biology and medicine

Population dynamics
 Arditi–Ginzburg equations to describe predator–prey dynamics
 Fisher's equation to model population growth
 Kolmogorov–Petrovsky–Piskunov equation to model population growth
 Lotka–Volterra equations to describe the dynamics of biological systems in which two species interact
 Predator–prey equations to describe the dynamics of biological systems in which two species interact

Economics and finance

Linguistics
 Replicator dynamics in evolutionary linguistics

References

Differential equations